Sembrancher railway station is a railway station in the municipality of Sembrancher, in the Swiss canton of Valais.

Services 
 the following services stop at Sembrancher:

 Regio:

References

External links 
 
 

Railway stations in the canton of Valais
Transports de Martigny et Régions stations